Panara jarbas is a species in the butterfly family Riodinidae found in Brazil. It was first described by Dru Drury in 1782.

Description 
Upperside. Antennae black. Thorax and abdomen nearly black. Wings brownish black. An orange-coloured bar, about a quarter of an inch broad, crosses the anterior wings from the middle of the anterior edges to the lower corners, from whence another of half that breadth crosses the posterior wings, meeting just below the anus.

Underside. Tongue, legs, breast, and abdomen dark brown, the latter having a small orange streak on each side. Wings coloured as on the upperside. Margins of the wings entire. Wing-span  inches (44 mm).

Subspecies
Panara jarbas jarbas (Brazil: western Rio de Janeiro, south-eastern Minas Gerais, northern Espirito Santo, Pernambuco)
Panara jarbas episatnius Prittwitz, 1865 (Brazil: Rio de Janeiro, Espírito Santo, eastern Minas Gerais)
Panara jarbas thymele Stichel, 1909 (Brazil: Bahia, western Parana, São Paulo, Rio de Janeiro)

References

Riodininae
Riodinidae of South America
Butterflies described in 1782
Descriptions from Illustrations of Exotic Entomology
Taxa named by Dru Drury